Peters Creek is an unincorporated community in Hardin County, Illinois, United States. Peters Creek is located on Illinois Route 146, northeast of Elizabethtown.

Notable people
Logan Belt (October 10, 1840 - Jun. 6, 1887) was the outlaw leader of the Logan Belt Gang in Hardin County, Illinois.

References

Unincorporated communities in Hardin County, Illinois
Unincorporated communities in Illinois